Fanling South is one of the 18 constituencies in the North District of Hong Kong which was first created in 2015.

The constituency loosely covers Fanling with an estimated population of 14,716.

Councillors represented

Election results

2010s

References

Constituencies of Hong Kong
Constituencies of North District Council
2015 establishments in Hong Kong
Constituencies established in 2015
Fanling